Wrong Faced Cat Feed Collapse is the first studio album by British indie rock musician SJ Esau. Originally released in 2005, it was re-released on Anticon in 2007.

Critical reception

Marisa Brown of AllMusic gave the album 2.5 stars out of 5, commenting that "[SJ] Esau's voice -- part singsongy whine, part breathy croon -- works well as a vessel for the absurdity he's trying to convey, but its contrast to the relatively straightforward, repetitive, even occasionally boring instrumentals behind him can be off-putting." Joe Tangari of Pitchfork gave the album a 4.2 out of 10, writing, "Focused melodies simply don't live here, which makes it hard to keep coming back to even the better arrangements." He added, "[Sam] Wisternoff certainly knows how to handle timbre and tone, but without marrying them to song, he's created an overly uniform record that doesn't stick." Dom Sinacola of Cokemachineglow gave the album a 79% rating, stating, "In fact, everything about Wrong Faced Cat Feed Collapse is overstated, from the milquetoast politics to the dins of release splitting most of the songs into parts."

Track listing

References

External links
 

2007 debut albums
Anticon albums
SJ Esau albums